NFLS may refer to:
 Nanjing Foreign Language School, a middle and high school located in Nanjing, Jiangsu, China
 Legius syndrome, also known as Neurofibromatosis 1-like syndrome, a genetic disorder